Kovrigino is a rural locality (a village) in Terebayevskoye Rural Settlement, Nikolsky District, Vologda Oblast, Russia. The population was 25 as of 2002.

Geography 
Kovrigino is located 32 km north of Nikolsk (the district's administrative centre) by road. Ivakovo is the nearest rural locality.

References 

Rural localities in Nikolsky District, Vologda Oblast